The Phoenix Roadrunners were a minor pro ice hockey team in Phoenix, Arizona. They played in the Central Hockey League in the 1977–78 season. After two months the team folded on December 12, 1977. They only played 27 games, winning only 4 and tying 3. They played in the Veterans Memorial Coliseum.

They followed after the World Hockey Association's Phoenix Roadrunners folded following the 1976–77 WHA season.

References

Central Professional Hockey League teams
Defunct ice hockey teams in the United States
1977 establishments in Arizona
1977 disestablishments in Arizona
Ice hockey clubs established in 1977
Ice hockey teams in Arizona
Ice hockey clubs disestablished in 1977
Sports in Phoenix, Arizona